Apollonius Dyscolus (reached his maturity sometime around 130 CE) is considered one of the greatest of the Greek grammarians.

Life
Little is known of Apollonius Dyscolus, other than that he was born at Alexandria, son of Mnesitheus.  The precise dates for his life are not known. His son Aelius Herodianus, who wrote on phonology, appears to have moved to Rome at the time of Marcus Aurelius. From this it is inferred that his father must have been a contemporary of Hadrian, and may have spent a short period in Rome during the reign of Antoninus Pius. One tradition holds that he was so poor that he could not afford papyri to write on, and was constrained to avail himself of potsherds to write down his thoughts. His monicker ho dúskolos signifying "the difficult" or "crabby/grouchy" may reflect the sour temper of someone reduced to eking out a living in extreme indigence. Various interpretations have been advanced arguing the nickname was expressive of his highly compressed, difficult style, or as illustrating his cantankerously disputatious manner, or as alluding to his habit of citing arcane words in contests with other grammarians, in order to perplex them. He died in poverty in what was formerly the royal quarter of the city of Alexandria.

Works
He was the founder of scientific syntax, and is styled by Priscian maximus auctor artis grammaticae ('the greatest authority on the science of grammar'), and grammaticorum princeps ('prince of grammarians'). He wrote extensively on the parts of speech. Of the twenty books named in the Suda, four are extant: on syntax, and three smaller treatises: on adverbs, on conjunctions, and on pronouns. One characteristic which was to influence later generations was Apollonius' deployment of philosophical concepts in grammatical analysis. The earlier Alexandrine grammatical tradition was familiar with distinctions such as that between genos and eidos, but these were not used in refining distinctions between the parts of speech. Apollonius drew on Stoic ontology to analyse the noun and the verb.

Like his son, Aelius Herodianus, he had an enormous influence on all later grammarians.

Notes

Citations

Sources

Further reading
 Andreas U. Schmidhauser, "Apollonius Dyscolus. De pronomine pars generalis", PhD thesis, University of Geneva, 2007. Comprehensive critical text with English translation.

External links 
 Apollonius Dyscolus – a website dedicated to Apollonius.
 Grecae linguae dialecti, in scholae regiae westmonasteriensis usum (...) praefationem & appendicem ex Apollonii Dyscoli fragmento inedito, J. F. Reitzius (ed.), Hgae-comitis, apud Joannem Neaulme, Biblipolam., 1738.
 Historiae commentitiae liber, sive historiae mirabiles, Guilielmus Xyladrus, Joannes Meursius, Ludovicus Henricus Teucherus (ed.), Lipsiae in bibliopolio gleditschiano, 1792.
 De pronomine liber, Immanuel Bekker (ed.), Berolini, in libraria scholae realis, 1813.
 De constructione orationis libri quatuor, Immanuel Bekker (ed.), Berolini impensis Ge. Reimeri, 1817.

2nd-century Egyptian people
2nd-century writers
Ancient Greek grammarians
Roman-era Alexandrians

Year of birth unknown
Year of death unknown